Carex sylvatica is a species of sedge found in deciduous woodlands across Europe. It is also used as a garden plant, and has been introduced to North America and New Zealand.

Description
Its rhizomes are very short, giving the plant a densely cespitose (tufted) form. The leaves have a slight keel, or are folded gently into an M-shape in cross-section.

The top half or third of the stem bears the inflorescence, typically comprising 3–5 female spikes and a single apical male spike, which may include a few female flowers at its base.

Taxonomy
Carex sylvatica was first described by the English botanist William Hudson in his 1762 work Flora Anglica. Hybrids have been reported between C. sylvatica and C. strigosa (in France) and between C. sylvatica and C. hirta (in Austria). Its English common name is "wood-sedge", or, in North America, "European woodland sedge".

Distribution and ecology
Carex sylvatica is found across Europe, and into parts of Asia, as far east as Iran. It has also been introduced to North America, where it occurs in Ontario, New York and North Carolina, and to New Zealand, where it was first recorded in 1969.

In its native range, C. sylvatica lives in deciduous woodlands on heavy soils; it is sometimes found in unwooded areas, but usually only as a relic of ancient woodland. In North America, it is generally found in disturbed areas within deciduous woodland.

Uses
Carex sylvatica can be used in gardens as ground cover under trees or shrubs. Carl Linnaeus recorded that the Sami people used the plant as an insulating wadding.

References

External links
 Marek Nowicki, Radosław Walkowiak, Carex sylvatica, Pieniny National Park (Slovakia), CTC, 2019

sylvatica
Flora of Europe
Plants described in 1762
Taxa named by William Hudson (botanist)